Beholder may refer to:

Film and TV
"The Beholder" (The Outer Limits), episode of the television series The Outer Limits
Beholder, an episode of The Bridge
Beholder, an episode of Almost Human
Beholder, an episode of The Invisible Man

Other
Beholder (Dungeons & Dragons), a fictional monster in the Dungeons & Dragons role-playing game
Beholder (horse), race horse winner of the 2013 and 2016 Breeders' Cup Distaff
Beholder (video game), a 2016 video game
Beholder Kft., Hungarian publishing company
The Beholder (magazine), a role-playing game magazine
The Beholder, novel by Julian Davies 1996

The Beholder, nickname of Jeroen Streunding from Neophyte

See also

Eye of the Beholder (disambiguation)